There are at least 25 members of the order Violales found in Montana. Some of these species are exotics (not native to Montana) and some species have been designated as Species of Concern.

Blazingstar and stickleaf
Family: Loasaceae

Mentzelia albicaulis, white-stem stickleaf
Mentzelia decapetala, ten-petal blazingstar
Mentzelia dispersa, mada stickleaf
Mentzelia laevicaulis, giant blazingstar
Mentzelia nuda, bractless blazingstar
Mentzelia pumila, dwarf mentzelia

Cucumber

Family: Cucurbitaceae
Bryonia alba, white bryony
Echinocystis lobata, wild cucumber

Tamarisk
Family: Tamaricaceae
Tamarix ramosissima, salt-cedar

Violets

Family: Violaceae

Viola adunca, sand violet
Viola arvensis, small wild pansy
Viola canadensis, Canada violet
Viola glabella, smooth yellow woodland violet
Viola macloskeyi, smooth white violet
Viola nephrophylla, northern bog violet
Viola nuttallii, Nuttall's violet
Viola nuttallii var. praemorsa, upland yellow violet
Viola nuttallii var. vallicola, valley violet
Viola orbiculata, roundleaf violet
Viola palustris, alpine marsh violet
Viola pedatifida, prairie violet
Viola purpurea, pine violet
Viola renifolia, kidney-leaf white violet
Viola selkirkii, great-spurred violet
Viola septentrionalis, northern blue violet

See also
 List of dicotyledons of Montana

Notes

Montana